Juy Vakil is a village in Balkh Province in northern Afghanistan.

It is located near the border with Uzbekistan.

See also 
Balkh Province

References

External links
Satellite map at Maplandia.com

Populated places in Balkh Province